The Sirène-class submarines were a group of four submarines built for the French Navy during the first decade of the 20th century. They were stricken from the Navy List in November 1919.

Ships

See also 
List of submarines of France

Notes

Bibliography

External links
French Submarines: 1863 - Now
Sous-marins Français 1863 -  (French)

Submarine classes
 
Ship classes of the French Navy